The Logitech G27 is a racing wheel made by Logitech. It supports PlayStation 3, PlayStation 2 and PC. It replaced the Logitech G25 in 2010, with some new features including the use of helical gearing instead of the previous straight gears used on the G25. As of December 2015, the G27 is no longer sold by Logitech, in favor of the newer G29 and G920 steering wheels now offered by Logitech.

Specifications
It features:
 A wheel:
 270 mm, leather-wrapped steering wheel
 Range of rotation adjustable up to 900 degrees
 2 force feedback motors
 One set of gears between motors and wheel, including an anti-backlash design
 2 paddle shifters
 6 buttons
 Dual-motor force feedback with helical gears that produces less noise than the G25, and provides better steering response
 A set of stainless steel pedals, including:
 Accelerator. (light spring)
 Brake (heavy spring)
 Clutch (medium spring)
 A carpet grip which keeps the pedals in position while in use
 A shifter unit:
 8 buttons
 1 D-pad
 A gear stick with a six-speed 'H' pattern gearbox. Reverse is selected by pressing down and changing to sixth
 Unlike the superseded Logitech G25, the shifter unit does not include a selector to switch to sequential up-down mode, only allowing six-speed mode to be used. The shift click has improved though and gives less noise

Compatibility
 PlayStation 3 
 PlayStation 2
 PC

See also

 Logitech 'G' series
 Logitech G25
 Steering wheel
 Logitech Driving Force Pro
 List of Logitech Racing Wheels compatible games
 Racing game
 Sim racing

References

Further reading

External links
 

Game controllers
Computer peripherals
Computing input devices
G27